The 1st constituency of the Corrèze is one of two French legislative constituencies in the Corrèze department (Limousin).  There were three constituencies in the department until the 2010 redistricting of French legislative constituencies.

Following that redistricting, it consists of the following (pre-2015) cantons : Argentat, Bort-les-Orgues, Bugeat, Corrèze, Donzenac, Égletons, Eygurande, Lapleau, Meymac, Neuvic, La Roche-Canillac, Seilhac, Sornac, Treignac, Tulle-Campagne-Nord, Tulle-Campagne-Sud, Tulle-Urbain-Nord, Tulle-Urbain-Sud, Ussel-Est, Ussel-Ouest, Uzerche, Vigeois.

Deputies

Election results

2022

 
 
 
 
 
 
 
 
|-
| colspan="8" bgcolor="#E9E9E9"|
|-
 
 

 
 
 
 
 

* PS dissident

2017

2012 

Sophie Dessus was elected deputy. She died in office on 3 March 2016, and was replaced by her substitute Alain Ballay the following day.

2007 

 
 
 
 
 
|-
| colspan="8" bgcolor="#E9E9E9"|
|-

2002

 
 
 
 
 
 
|-
| colspan="8" bgcolor="#E9E9E9"|
|-

1997

Sources

 Notes and portraits of the French MPs under the Fifth Republic, French National Assembly
 2007 results in the Corrèze's 1st constituency, Minister of the Interior
 Constituencies of the Corrèze, Atlaspol website

1